Aglossa furva is a species of snout moth in the genus Aglossa. It was described by Carl Heinrich in 1931. It is found in North America, including the type location of British Columbia.

References

Moths described in 1931
Pyralini
Moths of North America